|}

The Ridgewood Pearl Stakes, also known as the Lanwades Stud Stakes, is a Group 2 flat horse race in Ireland open to thoroughbred fillies and mares aged four years or older. It is run at the Curragh over a distance of 1 mile (1,609 metres), and it is scheduled to take place each year in May.

The event's registered title honours Ridgewood Pearl, a successful Irish-trained filly in the mid 1990s. Ridgewood Pearl died in 2003, and the title was first used for that year's running of a race now called the Renaissance Stakes.

The present Ridgewood Pearl Stakes was established in 2004, and it initially held Group 2 status. It was downgraded to Group 3 level in 2007 and returned to Group 2 status in 2015.

The race was sponsored by TRI Equestrian from 2009 to 2012, and was referred to as the TRI Equestrian Stakes. In 2013 it was renamed the Abu Dhabi Stakes and in 2014 the sponsorship was taken over by Lanwades Stud. It is held on the same afternoon as the Irish 2,000 Guineas.

Records
Most successful horse (2 wins):
 Emulous - 2011, 2012

Leading jockey (4 wins):
 Pat Smullen – Cheyenne Star (2007), Emulous (2011, 2012), Brooch (2015)

Leading trainer (3 wins):
 Dermot Weld - Emulous (2011, 2012), Brooch (2015)

Winners

See also
 Horse racing in Ireland
 List of Irish flat horse races

References

 Racing Post:

 galopp-sieger.de – Ridgewood Pearl Stakes.
 horseracingintfed.com – International Federation of Horseracing Authorities – Ridgewood Pearl Stakes (2018).
 pedigreequery.com – Ridgewood Pearl Stakes – Curragh.

Flat races in Ireland
Curragh Racecourse
Mile category horse races for fillies and mares
Recurring sporting events established in 2004
2004 establishments in Ireland